Jacques Weulersse (1905-1946) was a French geographer of Africa and the Arab world.

Early life 
On February 11, 1905, Weulersse was born in Paris, France.

Education 
In 1928, Weulersse received his bachelor's degree in history and geography. 
In 1928, Weulersse received the last Autour Du Monte travel scholarship that was financed by a foundation funded by Albert Kahn, a banker.

In 1941, Weulersse obtained his Doctorate of Letters.

Career 
Weulersse became a professor at Chartres, and at Lycée Condorcet.

In 1943, Weulersse became a master of colonial geography at Aix-Marseille University.

Personal life 
On August 28, 1946, Weulersse died in Dakar, Senegal.

Works 
 Le pays des Alaouites, Thèse, Tours, Arrault, 1940, 2 volumes, 422 p. 
 Noirs et Blancs. A travers l'Afrique nouvelle de Dakar au Cap, Paris, Armand Colin, 1931, 242 p. (Re-printed 1993, Paris)

See also 
 Albert Kahn (banker) - provider of travelling scholarship.
 Maurice Le Lannou

References

Additional sources

External links 
 Weulersse, Jacques at photographesenoutremerafrique.blogspot.com (in French)

French geographers
1905 births
1946 deaths
20th-century geographers